Park Naylor is a residential neighborhood located in southeast Washington, D.C. It takes its name from its northern and eastern borders, Naylor Road and Fort Stanton Park. Park Naylor's other boundaries are Minnesota Avenue to the west, and Good Hope Road SE to the south. Also see article on Anacostia.

Neighborhoods in Southeast (Washington, D.C.)